Grande-Rivière-du-Nord is an arrondissement in the Nord Department of Haiti. As of 2015, the population was 64,613 inhabitants. Postal codes in the Grande-Rivière-du-Nord Arrondissement start with the number 13.

The arrondissement consists of the following communes:
 Grande-Rivière-du-Nord
 Bahon

References

Arrondissements of Haiti
Nord (Haitian department)